The 30th Armored Brigade is a military formation of the Republic of Korea Army. The brigade is subordinated to the I Corps.

History 
Following the defense reform, the 30th Mechanized Infantry Division was disbanded on 30 November 2020, and reorganized to the 30th Armored Brigade.

Subordinate units of 30th Mechanized Infantry Division and the 90th Brigade merged into the 30th Armored Brigade. The former 90th brigade headquarters was also selected as the site for the brigade headquarters.

Organization 

Headquarters:
Headquarters Company
Air Defense Artillery Battery
Armored Engineer Company
Chemical Company
Armored Reconnaissance Company
Signal Company
Support Company
Intelligence Company
51st Armored Battalion (K1A2)
52nd Armored Battalion (K1A2)
53rd Armored Battalion (K1A2)
115th Mechanized Infantry Battalion (K200)
119th Mechanized Infantry Battalion (K200)
311st Artillery Battalion (K55A1)
315th Artillery Battalion (K55A1)

References 

Military units and formations established in 1955
Military units and formations established in 2020
Goyang